The Elevado do Perimetral, also known as Via Elevada da Perimetral, was an elevated highway on the Avenida Rodrigues Alves, which connected the main road junctions of the city of Rio de Janeiro, in Brazil. It was developed in stages between 1950 and 1960 and was demolished in 2013 and 2014 as part of the redevelopment of the Port of Rio de Janeiro.

Transport in Rio de Janeiro (city)

pt:Elevado do Perimetral